The Town of Brisbane colonial by-election, 1864 was a by-election held on 22 April 1864 in the electoral district of Town of Brisbane for the Queensland Legislative Assembly.

History
On 8 April 1864, George Raff, member for Town of Brisbane, resigned. William Brookes won the resulting by-election on 22 April 1864.

See also
 Members of the Queensland Legislative Assembly, 1863–1867

References

1864 elections in Australia
Queensland state by-elections
19th century in Brisbane
1860s in Queensland